Run and Kill is a 1993 Hong Kong crime thriller exploitation film directed by Billy Tang.  The film follows Fatty Cheung (Kent Cheng), a businessman who accidentally places a hit on his cheating wife, causing an escalating spiral of violence with the police (who believe him to be the killer) and the criminal organization (who want money for carrying out the hit).

Plot

Cast

Reception

External links
 
 

1990s Cantonese-language films
Hong Kong crime thriller films
1993 films
1993 crime thriller films
Films directed by Billy Tang
1990s Hong Kong films